Waterloo Township is one of eighteen townships in Allamakee County, Iowa, USA.  At the 2010 census, its population was 266.

History
Waterloo Township was organized in 1856.

Geography
It contains the unincorporated community of Dorchester. According to the USGS, it contains four cemeteries: Saint Johns, Saint Marys, Waterloo Ridge and West Waterloo Ridge.

References

External links
 US-Counties.com
 City-Data.com

Townships in Allamakee County, Iowa
Townships in Iowa
1856 establishments in Iowa
Populated places established in 1856